In rhetoric, a parenthesis (plural: parentheses; from the Ancient Greek word παρένθεσις parénthesis 'injection, insertion', literally '(a) putting in beside') or parenthetical phrase is an explanatory or qualifying word, clause, or sentence inserted into a passage. The parenthesis could be left out and still form grammatically correct text. Parenthetical expressions are usually delimited by round or square brackets, dashes, or commas.

Examples
Billy-bob, a great singer, was not a good dancer.The phrase a great singer, set off by commas, is both an appositive and a parenthesis.
A dog (not a cat) is an animal that barks.The phrase not a cat is a parenthesis.
My umbrella (which is somewhat broken) can still shield the two of us from the rain.The phrase which is somewhat broken is a parenthesis.
Please, Gerald, come here! Gerald is both a noun of direct address and a parenthesis.

Types
The following are examples of types of parenthetical phrases:
Introductory phrase: Once upon a time, my father ate a muffin.
Interjection: My father ate the muffin, gosh damn it!
Aside: My father, if you don't mind me telling you this, ate the muffin.
Appositive: My father, a jaded and bitter man, ate the muffin.
Absolute phrase: My father, his eyes flashing with rage, ate the muffin.
Free modifier: My father, chewing with unbridled fury, ate the muffin.
Resumptive modifier: My father ate the muffin, a muffin which no man had yet chewed.
Summative modifier: My father ate the muffin, a feat which no man had attempted.

Punctuation
While a parenthesis need not be written enclosed by the curved brackets called parentheses, their use, principally around rhetorical parentheses, has made the punctuation marks the only common use for the term in most contexts.

English-language style and usage guides originating in the news industry of the twentieth century, such as the AP Stylebook, recommend against the use of square brackets for parenthesis and other purposes, because "They cannot be transmitted over news wires." Usage of parentheses goes back (at least) to the 15th century in English legal documents.

References 

Rhetoric
Grammar
Punctuation